Antonio Da Passano (Genoa, 1599Genoa, 1681) was the 123rd Doge of the Republic of Genoa and king of Corsica.

Biography 
Da Passano was elected Doge of the Republic with the election of 11 July 1675 and his mandate was the seventy-eighth in two-year succession and the one hundred and twenty-third in republican history. As doge he was also invested with the related biennial office of king of Corsica. His interventions include an institutional clash between his person and the supreme syndicators for the sending of some galleys, without his authorization, which granted to hunt down a Turkish ship that threatened the Ligurian coast.

See also 
 Republic of Genoa
 Doge of Genoa

References 

17th-century Doges of Genoa
1599 births
1681 deaths